The Cleveland Masonic Temple in Cleveland, Ohio is a building from 1921. It contains 2 large organs (Austin opus 823 and a Wurlitzer Opus 793). It was designed by Hubbell and Benes, architects.  It was listed on the National Register of Historic Places in 2001.

References

External links

Ancient Accepted Scottish Rite Valley of Cleveland
Performance Arts Center at the Cleveland Masonic Auditorium

Masonic buildings completed in 1921
Buildings and structures in Cleveland
Masonic buildings in Ohio
Clubhouses on the National Register of Historic Places in Ohio
National Register of Historic Places in Cleveland, Ohio
1921 establishments in Ohio
Public venues with a theatre organ